The Solonian constitution was created by Solon in the early 6th century BC. At the time of Solon the Athenian State was almost falling to pieces in consequence of dissensions between the parties into which the population was divided. Solon wanted to revise or abolish the older laws of Draco. He promulgated a code of laws embracing the whole of public and private life, the salutary effects of which lasted long after the end of his constitution.

Under Solon's reforms, all debts were abolished and all debt-slaves were freed. The status of the hectemoroi (the "one-sixth workers"), who farmed in an early form of serfdom, was also abolished. These reforms were known as the Seisachtheia. Solon's constitution reduced the power of the old aristocracy by making wealth rather than birth a criterion for holding political positions, a system called timokratia (timocracy). Citizens were also divided based on their land production: pentacosiomedimnoi, hippeis, zeugitae, and thetes. The lower assembly was given the right to hear appeals, and Solon also created the higher assembly. Both of these were meant to decrease the power of the Areopagus, the aristocratic council.  The only parts of Draconian constitution that Solon kept were the laws regarding homicide. The constitution was written as poetry, and as soon as it was introduced, Solon went into self-imposed exile for ten years so he would not be tempted to take power as a tyrant.

Classes

Pentacosiomedimnoi
The pentacosiomedimni or pentakosiomedimnoi were the top class of citizens: those whose property or estate could produce 500 medimnoi of wet or dry goods (or their equivalent), per year. They were eligible for all top positions of government in Athens. These were:
 9 archons and treasurers
 Council of Areopagus (as ex-archons)
 Council of 400
 Ecclesia

The pentacosiomedimnoi could also serve as generals (strategoi) in the Athenian army.

Hippeis

The hippeus was the second highest of the four social classes. It was composed of men who had at least 300 medimnoi or their equivalent as yearly income.

Zeugitae
The zeugitae or zeugitai were those whose property or estate could produce 200 medimnoi of wet or dry goods (or their equivalent), per year. The term appears to have come from the Greek word for "yoke", which has led modern scholars to conclude that zeugitae were either men who could afford a yoke of oxen or men who were "yoked together" in the phalanx—that is, men who could afford their own hoplite armor.

The zeugitae could serve as hoplites in the Athenian army. The idea was that one could serve as a hoplite if he had enough money to equip himself in that manner, i.e. he could produce 200 medimnoi or more per year.

At the time of Solon's reforms, zeugitae were granted the right to hold certain minor political offices. Their status rose through the years; in 457/6 BC they were granted the right to hold the archonship, and in the late 5th century moderate oligarchs advocated for the creation of an oligarchy in which all men of hoplite status or higher would be enfranchised, and such a regime was indeed established for a time during the Athenian coup of 411 BC.

They were eligible for a few positions of government in Athens such as:
 Council of 400
 Lower offices of state
 Ecclesia
 In 457/6 BC, the archonship was opened to zeugitae

Thetes
The thetes (thêtes, sing. θής, thēs, "serf") were the lowest social class of citizens. The thetes were those who were workers for wages, or had less than 200 medimnoi (or their equivalent) as yearly income. This distinction spanned from some time earlier than 594/593 BC until 322 BC. The thetes were defined as citizens who did not qualify as zeugitae, although the thetes may have predated the Solonian reforms. They could participate in the Ecclesia (the Athenian assembly), and could be jurors serving in the law court of the Heliaia, but were not allowed to serve in the Boule or serve as magistrates.

In the reforms of Ephialtes and Pericles around 460450 BC, the thetes were empowered to hold public office.

12,000 thetes were disenfranchised and expelled from the city after the Athenian defeat in the Lamian War. There is debate among scholars whether this represented the entire number of thetes, or simply those who left Athens, the remainder staying behind.

Unlike the popular concept of galley slaves, ancient navies generally preferred to rely on free men to row their galleys. In the 4th and 5th century Athens generally followed a naval policy of enrolling citizens from the lower classes (the thetes), metics and hired foreigners. However, under some conditions, for example during the Mytilenean revolt, higher classes were enrolled as rowers also. This made them crucial in the Athenian Navy and therefore gave them a role in Athens' affairs (see Constitution of the Athenians).

Details
Of the population dissatisfied, the inhabitants of the northern mountainous region of Attica, and the poorest and most oppressed section of the population, the diacrii, demanded that the privileges of the nobility, which had till then been obtained, should be utterly set aside. Another party, prepared to be contented by moderate concessions, was composed of the parali, the inhabitants of the stretch of coast called Paralia. The third was formed by the nobles, called pedici or pediaci, because their property lay for the most part in the pedion, the level and most fruitful part of the country. Solon, who enjoyed the confidence of all parties on account of his tried insight and sound judgment, was chosen archon by a compromise, with full power to put an end to the difficulties, and to restore peace by means of legislation. One of the primary measures of Solon was the Seisachtheia ("dis-burdening ordinance"). This gave an immediate relief by cancelling all debts, public and private. At the same time he made it illegal for the future to secure debts upon the person of the debtor.

Solon also altered the standard of coinage [and of weights and measures], by introducing the Euboic standard in place of the Pheidonian or Aeginetan standard. 100 new drachmae were thus made to contain the same amount of silver as 73 old drachmae.

Timocracy

Solon further instituted a timocracy, and those who did not belong to the nobility received a share in the rights of citizens, according to a scale determined by their property and their corresponding services to the Athenian State. For this purpose he divided the population into four classes, founded on the possession of land:
 pentacosiomedimni (or pentacosiomedimnoi) – who had at least 500 medimni of produce as yearly income
 hippeis – knights, with at least 300 medimni
 zeugitae – possessors of a yoke of oxen, with at least 150 medimni
 thetes – workers for wages, with less than 150 medimni of yearly income

Solon's legislation only granted to the first three of these four classes a vote in the election of responsible officers, and only to the first class the power of election to the highest offices; as, for instance, that of archon. The first three classes were bound to serve as hoplites; the cavalry was raised out of the first two, while the fourth class was only employed as light-armed troops or on the fleet, and apparently for pay. The others served without pay. The holders of office in the State were also unpaid.

Each division had different rights; for example, the pentacosiomedimnoi could be archons, while thetes could only attend the Athenian assembly. The fourth class was excluded from all official positions, but possessed the right of voting in the general public assemblies (the Heliaia) which chose officials and passed laws. They had also the right of taking part in the trials by jury which Solon had instituted.

Council of the Four Hundred

Solon established a constitutional order with a single chief consultative body, and a single administrative body. Solon established as the chief consultative body the Council of the Four Hundred, in which only the first three classes took part, and as chief administrative body the Areopagus, which was to be filled up by those who had been archons.

See also
History of democracy
Reforms of Cleisthenes
The Other Greeks

References and citations

Further reading
Greenidge, Abel Hendy Jones (1896): A Handbook of Greek Constitutional History, Macmillan and Company, "§ 3 Epochs Of Constitutional Reform At Athens".
Linforth, Ivan Mortimer (1919): Solon the Athenian, vol. 6, University of California Press.
Fine, John V.A. (1983): The Ancient Greeks: A critical history, Harvard University Press. .
Kagan, Donald (2003): The Peloponnesian War, Penguin Books. .
Renshaw, James (2008): In Search of the Greeks, A&C Black. 

Whitehead, David (1981): "The Ancient Athenian ΖΕΥΓΙΤΑΙ", The Classical Quarterly, vol. 31, no. 2, pp. 282–286.

External links
 The Athenian Constitution, Aristotle (~350 BC). Commentary on the Solonian Constitution.
 The Lives of the Noble Grecians and Romans, Plutarch (~75 AD). Article on Solon.
 The Origin of the Family, Private Property, and the State, Frederick Engels. Chapter V. The Rise of the Athenian State,  discusses the significance and effects of Solonian Constitution.

Defunct constitutions
Government of ancient Athens
Ancient Greek law
Archaic Athens
Ancient Greek constitutions